The 2010 Veikkausliiga was the 80th season of top-tier football in Finland. It began on 16 April 2010 and ended on 23 October 2010.

Teams
RoPS finished at the bottom of the 2009 season and were relegated to Ykkönen. Their place was taken by Ykkönen champions AC Oulu. 13th-placed Veikkausliiga team JJK and Ykkönen runners-up KPV competed in a two-legged relegation play-offs for one spot in this season. JJK won 5–3 on aggregate and thereby retained their league position.

Team summaries

League table

Relegation play-offs
The 13th placed team of 2010 Veikkausliiga and the runners-up of the 2010 Ykkönen will compete in a two-legged play-offs for one spot in the 2011 Veikkausliiga. JJK won the playoffs by 3-1 and remained again in Veikkausliiga.

Results

Statistics

Top goalscorers
Source: veikkausliiga.com

Top assistants
Source: veikkausliiga.com

Monthly awards

Players of the year 
Source: veikkausliiga.com

References

External links
 Official site 
 uefa.com

Veikkausliiga seasons
Fin
Fin
1